Little Sister may refer to:

 Birth order

Literature
 The Little Sister, a 1949 novel by Raymond Chandler
 Kana: Little Sister, a 1999 Japanese visual novel

Film and television
 The Little Sister (1911 film), a short
 The Little Sister (1914 film), a short starring Tom Mix
 Little Sister (1921 film), a 1921 Italian silent film
 The Little Sister (1986 film), featuring Peter Gerety
 Little Sister (1992 film), a comedy starring Jonathan Silverman and Alyssa Milano
 Little Sister (1995 film), a Dutch film
 Little Sister (2010 film), directed and written by Richard Bowen
 Little Sister (2016 film), directed and written by Zach Clark
 "The Little Sister" (Roseanne), a 1989 episode of the TV sitcom Roseanne
 "Little Sister" (Golden Girls episode)

Music
 Little Sister (band), Sly & the Family Stone's background vocalists
 "Little Sister" (Elvis Presley song), a song released by Elvis Presley in 1961, and later covered by Ry Cooder and by Dwight Yoakam
 "Little Sister" (Queens of the Stone Age song)
 "Little Sister", a song by Jewel from Pieces of You
 "Little Sister", a song by the Runaways from Waitin' for the Night
 "Little Sister", a song by Lou Reed from the Get Crazy soundtrack
 "Little Sister", a song by Nico from Chelsea Girl
 "Little Sister", a song by Cheap Trick from Standing on the Edge
 "Bonnie Jean (Little Sister)", by David Lynn Jones
 "Little Sister", a song by Trixie Mattel from One Stone

Religion
 Little Sisters of the Abandoned Elderly, founded in Spain, a Roman Catholic religious congregation
 Little Sisters of the Assumption, a Roman Catholic religious institute
 Little Sisters of Jesus, a Roman Catholic congregation
 Little Sister Magdeleine of Jesus (1898–1989), founder of the Little Sisters of Jesus
 Little Sisters of the Lamb, a branch of a Roman Catholic religious institute, shaped both by Dominican and by Franciscan spirituality
 Little Sisters of the Poor, founded in France, a Roman Catholic religious institute for women
 Little Sisters of the Sacred Heart, a religious congregation in Montpellier

Other uses
 Little Sisters, an informal name for a group of some of the smaller members of the British Virgin Islands
 Little Sister (BioShock), fictional young girls in BioShock and BioShock 2
 Little Sister's Book and Art Emporium, a bookstore in Vancouver, Canada
 Little Sisters Book and Art Emporium v Canada (Minister of Justice), a court case regarding freedom of speech involving the bookstore

See also

 Nation's Little Sister, an informal title in the South Korean entertainment industry
 "Baby Sister", a 1985 song by La Toya Jackson
 LittleSis, an accountability project of the Public Accountability Initiative
 
 
 Lillasyster (Swedish for "little sister"), a Swedish rock band
 Petite soeur (disambiguation)